Richard Neile (or Neale; 1562 – 31 October 1640) was an English churchman, bishop successively of six English dioceses, more than any other man, including the Archdiocese of York from 1631 until his death. He was involved in the last burning at the stake for heresy in England, that of the Arian Edward Wightman in 1612.

Early life
Neile was born in Westminster, and baptised on 11 March 1562 at St Margaret's, Westminster.

He was son of a tallow-chandler, though his grandfather had been a courtier and official under Henry VIII, until he was deprived for non-compliance with the Six Articles. He was educated at Westminster School, under Edward Grant and William Camden. He was sent by Mildred, Lady Burghley (wife of Lord Burghley), on the recommendation of Gabriel Goodman to St John's College, Cambridge as a poor scholar, matriculating at Easter 1580, graduating B.A. 1584, M.A. 1587, B.D. 1595, D.D. 1600.

Ordained deacon and priest at Peterborough in 1589, he continued to enjoy the patronage of the Burghley family, residing in their household, and became chaplain to Lord Burghley, and later to his son Robert Cecil, 1st Earl of Salisbury.

He preached before Queen Elizabeth, and became vicar of Cheshunt, Hertfordshire (1590) and rector of Toddington, Bedfordshire (1598). He was appointed Master of the Savoy in 1602, and in July 1603 Clerk of the Closet, a position he would hold until 1632. On 5 November 1605 he was installed Dean of Westminster, resigning the deanery in 1610.

Bishop
He held successively the bishoprics of Rochester (1608), Lichfield and Coventry (1610), Lincoln (1614), Durham (1617), and Winchester (1628), and the archbishopric of York (1631).

While at Rochester he appointed William Laud as his chaplain and gave him several valuable preferments. His political activity while bishop of Durham was rewarded with a privy councillorship in 1627. Neile sat regularly in the courts of Star Chamber and High Commission. His correspondence with Laud and with Sir Dudley Carleton and Sir Francis Windebank (Charles I's secretaries of state) are valuable sources for the history of the time.

Oliver Cromwell made only one speech during his first stint as a Member of Parliament for Huntingdon in the Parliament of 1628–1629, a poorly received attack against Neile, possibly over disagreement with his form of Arminianism.

Family
Neile was the father of Sir Paul Neile, astronomer and politician, and grandfather of William Neile, mathematician. His brother, another William Neile (1560–1624), was a book-collector who left 880 books to his children at his death.

References

 Morrill, John (1990). "The Making of Oliver Cromwell", in Morrill, John (ed.), Oliver Cromwell and the English Revolution (Longman), .

Attribution

1562 births
1640 deaths
17th-century Anglican archbishops
17th-century Church of England bishops
Alumni of St John's College, Cambridge
Archbishops of York
Arminian theologians
Arminian ministers
Bishops of Durham
Bishops of Lichfield
Bishops of Lincoln
Bishops of Rochester
Bishops of Winchester
Burials at York Minster
Clerks of the Closet
Deans of Westminster
Doctors of Divinity
Lord-Lieutenants of Durham
Masters of the Savoy
People educated at Westminster School, London
1560s births